Robert Cletus Driscoll (March 3, 1937 –  March 30, 1968) was an American actor who performed on film and television from 1943 to 1960. He starred in some of the Walt Disney Studios' best-known live-action pictures of that period: Song of the South (1946), So Dear to My Heart (1949),  and Treasure Island (1950), as well as RKO's The Window (1949). He served as the animation model and provided the voice for the title role in Peter Pan (1953). He received an Academy Juvenile Award for outstanding performances in So Dear to My Heart and The Window.

In the mid-1950s, Driscoll's acting career began to decline, and he turned primarily to guest appearances on anthology TV series. He became addicted to narcotics, and was sentenced to prison for illicit drug use. After his release, he focused his attention on the avant-garde art scene. In ill health from his substance abuse, and with his funds depleted, his body was discovered on March 30, 1968, in an abandoned building in the East Village of Manhattan.

Early life
He was born Robert Cletus Driscoll in Cedar Rapids, Iowa, the only child of Cletus (1901–1969), an insulation salesman, and Isabelle (née Kratz; 1904–1981), a former schoolteacher. Shortly after his birth, the family moved to Des Moines, where they stayed until early 1943. The family moved to Los Angeles when a doctor advised the father to relocate to California because he was suffering from work-related handling of asbestos.

Driscoll's parents were encouraged to help their son become a child performer in films. Their barber's son, an actor, got Bobby an audition at MGM for a role in the family drama Lost Angel (1943), which starred Margaret O'Brien. While on a tour across the studio lot, five-year-old Driscoll noticed a mock-up ship and asked where the water was. The director was impressed by the boy's curiosity and intelligence and chose him over 40 applicants.

Career

"Wonder Child"

Driscoll's brief, two-minute debut helped him win the role of young Al Sullivan, the youngest of the five Sullivan brothers, in the 20th Century Fox's World War II drama The Fighting Sullivans (1944) with Thomas Mitchell and Anne Baxter. Additional screen portrayals included the boy who could blow his whistle while standing on his head in Sunday Dinner for a Soldier, the "child brother" of Richard Arlen in The Big Bonanza (both 1944), and young Percy Maxim in So Goes My Love (1946), with Don Ameche and Myrna Loy. He also had smaller roles in movies such as Identity Unknown (1945) and Miss Susie Slagle's, From This Day Forward, and O.S.S. with Alan Ladd (all 1946).

Disney

Driscoll and Luana Patten were the first two actors Walt Disney placed under contract. Driscoll then played the lead character in Song of the South (1946), which introduced live action into the producer's films in conjunction with extensive animated footage. The film turned Driscoll and his co-star Luana Patten into child stars, and they were discussed for a special Academy Award as the best child actors of the year, but for the year of its release, no juvenile awards were presented at all.

Now nicknamed by the American press as Walt Disney's "Sweetheart Team", Driscoll and Patten starred together in So Dear to My Heart (1948) with Burl Ives and Beulah Bondi. It was planned as Disney's first all-live-action movie, with production beginning immediately after Song of the South, but its release was delayed until late 1948 to meet the demands of Disney's co-producer and longtime distributor RKO Radio Pictures for animated content in the film.

Driscoll played Eddie Cantor's screen son in the RKO Studios musical comedy If You Knew Susie (also 1948), in which he teamed with former Our Gang member Margaret Kerry. Patten and he appeared with Roy Rogers and the Sons of the Pioneers in the live-action teaser for the Pecos Bill segment of Disney's cartoon compilation Melody Time (also 1948).

Driscoll was lent to RKO to star in The Window, based on Cornell Woolrich's short story "The Boy Cried Murder".  Howard Hughes, who had bought RKO the previous year, considered the film unworthy of release and Driscoll not much of an actor, so delayed its release. When it was released in May 1949, it became a surprise hit. The New York Times credited Driscoll with the film's success:

So Dear to My Heart and The Window earned Driscoll a special Juvenile Academy Award in March 1950 as the outstanding juvenile actor of 1949.

Driscoll was cast to play Jim Hawkins in Walt Disney's version of Robert Louis Stevenson's Treasure Island (1950), with British actor Robert Newton as Long John Silver, the studio's first all-live-action picture. The feature was filmed in the United Kingdom, and during production, Driscoll was found to not have a valid British work permit, so his family and Disney were fined and ordered to leave the country. They were allowed to remain for six weeks to prepare an appeal, and director Byron Haskin hastily shot all of Driscoll's close-ups, using his British stand-in to film missing location scenes after  his parents and he had returned to California.

Treasure Island was an international hit, and several other film projects involving Driscoll were under discussion, but none materialized. For example, Haskin recalled in his memoirs that Disney, although interested in Robert Louis Stevenson's pirate story as a full-length cartoon, always planned to cast Driscoll as Mark Twain's Tom Sawyer. He was at the perfect age for the role, but because of a story rights ownership dispute with Hollywood producer David O. Selznick, who had previously produced the property in 1938, Disney ultimately had to cancel the entire project. Driscoll also was scheduled to portray a youthful follower of Robin Hood following Treasure Island, again with Robert Newton, who would play Friar Tuck, but Driscoll's run-in with British immigration made this impossible.

Driscoll's second long-run Disney contract allowed him to be lent to independent Horizon Pictures for the double role of Danny/Josh Reed in When I Grow Up (1951). His casting was suggested by screenwriter Michael Kanin.

In addition to his brief guest appearance in Walt Disney's first television Christmas show in 1950, One Hour in Wonderland, Driscoll lent his voice to Goofy, Jr. in the Disney cartoon shorts "Fathers are People" and "Father's Lion", which were released in 1951 and 1952, respectively.

Driscoll portrayed Robert "Bibi" Bonnard in Richard Fleischer's comedy The Happy Time (1952), which was based on a Broadway play of the same name by Samuel A. Taylor. Cast with Charles Boyer, Marsha Hunt, Louis Jourdan, and Kurt Kasznar, he played the juvenile offspring of a patriarch in Quebec of the 1920s, the character upon whom the plot centered.

Driscoll's last major success, Peter Pan (1953), was produced largely between May 1949 and mid-1951. Driscoll was cast with Disney's "Little British Lady" Kathryn Beaumont, who was in the role of Wendy Darling; he was used as the reference model for the close-ups and provided Peter Pan's voice, and dancer and choreographer Roland Dupree was the model for the character's motion. Scenes were played on an almost empty sound stage, with only the most essential props, and filmed for use by the animators.

In his biography on Disney, Marc Elliot described Driscoll as the producer's favorite "live action" child star: "Walt often referred to Driscoll with great affection as the living embodiment of his own youth". During a project meeting following the completion of Peter Pan, though, Disney stated that he now saw Driscoll as best suited for roles as a young bully rather than a likeable protagonist. Driscoll's salary at Disney had been raised to $1,750 per week and compared to his salary, Driscoll had little work from 1952 on. In March 1953, the additional two-year option Driscoll had been extended (which would have kept him at Disney into 1956) was cancelled, just weeks after Peter Pan was released theatrically. A severe case of acne accompanying the onset of puberty, explaining why it was necessary for Driscoll to use heavy makeup for his performances on dozens of TV shows, was officially provided as the final reason for the termination of his connection with the Disney Studios.

Radio and television
Driscoll encountered increasing indifference from the other Hollywood studios. Still perceived as "Disney's kid actor", he was unable to get movie roles as a serious character actor. Beginning in 1953 and for most of the next three years, the bulk of his work was on television, on such anthology and drama series as Fireside Theater, Schlitz Playhouse of Stars, Front Row Center, Navy Log, TV Reader's Digest, Climax!, Ford Theatre, Studio One, Dragnet, Medic, and Dick Powell's Zane Grey Theatre. On another series, Men of Annapolis, he appeared with John Smith, future second husband of Driscoll's Song of the South co-star, Luana Patten.

In some special star-focusing series, Driscoll appeared with Loretta Young, Gloria Swanson, and Jane Wyman.

Between 1948 and 1957, he performed on a number of radio productions, which included a special broadcast version of Treasure Island in January 1951 and of Peter Pan in December 1953. As it was common practice in this business, Driscoll and Luana Patten also did promotional radio gigs (starting in late 1946 for Song of the South) and toured the country for various parades and charity events through the years.

In 1947, he recorded a special version of "So Dear to My Heart" at Capitol Records. In 1954, he was awarded a Milky Way Gold Star Award, chosen in a nationwide poll for his work on television and radio.

Post-Disney
After Driscoll left the Disney studios, his parents withdrew him from the Hollywood Professional School, which served child movie actors, and sent him to the public West Los Angeles University High School, instead. There, his grades dropped substantially, he was the target of ridicule for his previous film career, and he began to take drugs. He said later, "The other kids didn't accept me. They treated me as one apart. I tried desperately to be one of the gang. When they rejected me, I fought back, became belligerent and cocky—and was afraid all the time." At his request, Driscoll's parents returned him the next year to Hollywood Professional School, where in May 1955 he graduated.

His drug use increased; in an interview years later, he stated, "I was 17 when I first experimented with the stuff. In no time I was using whatever was available... mostly heroin, because I had the money to pay for it." In 1956, he was arrested for the first time for possession of marijuana, but the charge was dismissed. On July 24, 1956, Hedda Hopper wrote in the Los Angeles Times: "This could cost this fine lad and good actor his career." In 1957, he had only two television parts, as the loyal brother of a criminal immigrant in M Squad, a long-running crime series starring Lee Marvin, and as an officer aboard the submarine S-38 in an episode of the World War II docudrama series The Silent Service.

In December 1956, Driscoll and his longtime girlfriend, Marilyn Jean Rush (occasionally misspelled as "Brush"), eloped to Mexico to marry despite their parents' objections. The couple was later rewed in a ceremony that took place in Los Angeles in March 1957. They had two daughters and one son, but the relationship did not last. They separated, then divorced in 1960.

Later roles
Driscoll began using the name "Robert Driscoll" to distance himself from his youthful roles as "Bobby" (since 1951, he had been known to friends and family as "Bob", and in Schlitz Playhouse of Stars – Early Space Conquerors, 1952, was credited as "Bob Driscoll"). He landed two final screen roles: with Cornel Wilde in The Scarlet Coat (1955) and opposite Mark Damon, Connie Stevens, and Frances Farmer in The Party Crashers (1958). 

He was charged with disturbing the peace and assault with a deadly weapon, the latter after hitting one of two hecklers with a pistol who had made insulting remarks while he was washing a girlfriend's car; the charges were dropped.

His last known appearances on TV were small roles in two single-season series: The Best of the Post, a syndicated anthology series adapted from stories published in The Saturday Evening Post magazine, and The Brothers Brannagan, an unsuccessful crime series starring Stephen Dunne and Mark Roberts. Both were originally aired on November 5, 1960.

Late in 1961, he was sentenced as a drug addict and imprisoned at the Narcotic Rehabilitation Center of the California Institution for Men in Chino, California. When Driscoll left Chino in early 1962, he was unable to find acting work. Embittered by this, he said, "I have found that memories are not very useful. I was carried on a silver platter—and then dumped into the garbage."

New York City
In 1965, a year after his parole expired, he relocated to New York, hoping to revive his career on the Broadway stage, but was unsuccessful. He became part of Andy Warhol's Greenwich Village art community known as the Factory, where he began focusing on his artistic talents.

He had previously been encouraged to do so by artist and poet Wallace Berman, whom he had befriended after joining Berman's art circle (now also known as Semina Culture) in Los Angeles in 1956. Some of his works were considered outstanding, and a few of his surviving collages and cardboard mailers were temporarily exhibited in Los Angeles at the Santa Monica Museum of Art. 

In 1965, early in his tenure at the Factory, Driscoll gave his last known film performance, in experimental filmmaker Piero Heliczer's underground movie Dirt.

Death 
On March 30, 1968, two boys playing in a deserted East Village tenement at 371 East 10th Street found Driscoll's body lying on a cot, with two empty beer bottles and religious pamphlets scattered on the ground. A post mortem examination determined that he had died from heart failure caused by advanced atherosclerosis from his drug use. No identification was on the body, and photos shown around the neighborhood yielded no positive identification. His unclaimed body was buried in an unmarked pauper's grave in New York City's Potter's Field on Hart Island.

Late in 1969, Driscoll's mother sought the help of officials at Disney studios to contact him, for a hoped-for reunion with his father, who was nearing death. This resulted in a fingerprint match at the New York City Police Department, which located his burial on Hart Island. Although his name appears on his father's gravestone at Eternal Hills Memorial Park in Oceanside, California, his remains are still on Hart Island. In connection with the re-release of Song of the South in 1971, reporters researching the whereabouts of the film's star first reported his death.

Awards

Driscoll received an Academy Juvenile Award from the Academy of Motion Picture Arts and Sciences at the 22nd Academy Awards presentation in 1950. The award was presented as a special miniature Oscar statuette for "the outstanding juvenile actor of 1949" for his roles in So Dear to My Heart and The Window, both released that year. He also received the Milky Way Gold Star Award in 1954 for his work on television and radio.

For his contributions to the motion picture industry, Driscoll received a star on the Hollywood Walk of Fame at 1560 Vine Street in 1960.

Tributes
In February 2009, singer-songwriter Benjy Ferree released Come Back to the Five and Dime Bobby Dee Bobby Dee, a concept album based in part on Driscoll's life.

In September 2011, American singer-songwriter Tom Russell released the song "Farewell Never Neverland" on the album Mesabi, an elegy for Bobby Driscoll as Peter Pan.

Selected filmography

Film and television

Stage

Radio shows
(This is not necessarily a complete list; it displays all those that could be located and verified.)

Recordings

See also
 Wallace Berman (painting mentor)

References

Literature (selected)
 Byron Haskin – interviewed by Joe Adamson, The Directors Guild Of America and The Scarecrow Press, Inc. Metuchen, N.Y. and London, 1984  – pages 166–186 (on Treasure Island, 1950)
 Natasha Fraser-Cavassoni, Sam Spiegel – The Incredible Life and Times of Hollywood's Most Iconoclastic Producer [...], 2003 Simon & Schuster, New York, London, Toronto, Sydney, Singapore,  – pages 119–20, 134, 143, 267, 361 (on When I Grow Up,1951)
 Richard Fleischer, Just Tell Me When To Cry – a Memoir, 1993 Carroll & Graf Publishers, Inc., New York  – pages 79–83, 103 (on The Happy Time, 1952)
 Suzanne Gargiulo, Hans Conried – A Biography; with a Filmography and a Listing of Radio, Television, Stage and Voice Work, McFarland & Company Inc., Jefferson, North Carolina, 2002 – pages 78–79 (on Peter Pan, 1953)
 Michael Duncan and Christine McKenna, Semina Culture – Wallace Berman & His Circle, Santa Monica Museum Of Art, 2005 (on Driscoll's Artworks)
 Marc Elliot, Walt Disney – Hollywood's Dark Prince – A Biography, 1993, 1994, Andre Deutsch (publisher) Ltd., First (UK) Paperback edition, London, 1995, 
 Rudy Behlmer, Memo from David O. Selznick, The Viking Press, New York and Macmillan Company of Canada Ltd., 1972, ISBN unknown – pages 43n, 310, 431
 Maltin, Leonard. The Disney Films. Crown Publishers Inc., New York, 1973. LOC No. 72-84292. ISBN unknown – pages 74, 76, 78, 83–85, 87–88, 97–100, 107
 Mosley, Leonard. The Real Walt Disney. Grafton Books, 1986. .
 
 Zanuck, Darryl F. and Rudy Behlmer, editor. Memo from Darryl F. Zanuck: The Golden Years at Twentieth Century-Fox. (1995) .
 Holmstrom, John. The Moving Picture Boy: An International Encyclopaedia from 1895 to 1995, Norwich, Michael Russell, 1996, pages 202–203.
 David Dye, Child and Youth Actors: Filmography of Their Entire Careers, 1914–1985. Jefferson, NC: McFarland & Co., 1988, pages 62–64.
 Best, Marc. Those Endearing Young Charms: Child Performers of the Screen'', South Brunswick and New York: Barnes & Co., 1971, pages 80–84.

External links

 
 

 Driscoll article at Neverpedia

1937 births
1968 deaths
20th-century American male actors
Academy Juvenile Award winners
Actors from Cedar Rapids, Iowa
American male child actors
American male film actors
American male radio actors
American male stage actors
American male television actors
American male voice actors
Disney people
Drug-related deaths in New York City
Male actors from Iowa
People associated with The Factory
RCA Victor artists
University High School (Los Angeles) alumni
Burials on Hart Island